The Hon. Robert Baillie-Hamilton (8 October 1828 – 5 September 1891) was a British politician.

Background
Baillie-Hamilton was a younger son of George Baillie-Hamilton, 10th Earl of Haddington, and Georgina, daughter of the Venerable Robert Markham, Archdeacon of York. George Baillie-Hamilton-Arden, 11th Earl of Haddington, was his elder brother.

Political and military career
Baillie-Hamilton was a Major in the 44th Regiment. In 1874 he was returned to Parliament for Berwickshire, a seat he held until 1880.

Personal life
Baillie-Hamilton married Mary Gavin, daughter of Sir John Pringle, 5th Baronet, in 1861. The marriage was childless. He died in September 1891, aged 62. Mary Baillie-Hamilton died in April 1911.

References

External links 
 

1828 births
1891 deaths
Younger sons of earls
Members of the Parliament of the United Kingdom for Scottish constituencies
UK MPs 1874–1880
44th Regiment of Foot officers
Unionist Party (Scotland) MPs
Robert